Crossolida is a genus of very small sea snails or micromolluscs, marine gastropod molluscs in the family Conradiidae.

Species
Species within the genus Crossolida include:
 Crossolida marquesensis (Rubio, Rolán & Letourneux, 2017)
 Crossolida papuaensis Rubio & Rolán, 2019
 Crossolida robusta Rubio & Rolán, 2019
 Crossolida satispiralis Rubio & Rolán, 2019

References

 Rubio F. & Rolán E. (2019). New species of Conradiidae Golikov & Starobogatov, 1987 (= Crosseolidae Hickman, 2013) (Gastropoda: Trochoidea) from the Tropical Indo-Pacific II. The genus Crosseola and the description of Crossolida n. gen. Novapex. 20(3): 49-91

Conradiidae